The following Union Army units and commanders fought in the Battle of Wilmington (February 11-22, 1865) of the American Civil War. The Confederate order of battle is listed separately.

Abbreviations used

Military Rank
 MG = Major General
 BG = Brigadier General
 Col = Colonel
 Ltc = Lieutenant Colonel
 Bvt = Brevet

Department of North Carolina/Wilmington Expeditionary Force

MG John M. Schofield
 Chief Engineer: Bvt BG Cyrus B. Comstock
 Chief Quartermaster: Col George Sullivan Dodge

XXIII Corps

MG John M. Schofield

Terry's Provisional Corps
MG Alfred H. Terry
Chief of Staff - BG Joseph R. Hawley

North Atlantic Blockading Squadron

Rear Admiral David D. Porter

 Cape Fear River
 USS Bat
 USS Berberry
 USS Chippewa
 USS Emma
 USS Eolus
 USS Huron
 USS Kansas
 USS Launch No. 1
 USS Launch No. 6
 USS Lenapee
 USS Little Ada
 USS Mackinaw
 USS Malvern
 USS Maratanza
 USS Maumee
 USS Moccasin
 USS Montauk
 USS Nansemond
 USS Nyack
 USS Osceola
 USS Pawtuxet
 USS Pequot
 USS Pontoosuc
 USS Republic
 USS Sassacus
 USS Seneca
 USS Shawmut
 USS Unadilla
 USS Wilderness
 USS Yantic
 Fort Fisher
 USS Aries
 USS Howquah
 USS Keystone State
 USS Montgomery
 USS Monticello
 USS R. R. Cuyler
 USS Vicksburg

See also

 North Carolina in the American Civil War

Notes

References
 NC Historic Sites - Fort Fisher
 Eicher, John H., and Eicher, David J., Civil War High Commands, Stanford University Press, 2001, .

American Civil War orders of battle